Niall Stokes  (born 1951 in Dublin) is a music journalist who has served as editor of the long-running fortnightly Ireland music and political magazine Hot Press based in Dublin. He has edited the magazine since 1977. He has been a longstanding champion of Irish music, most famously U2 in the late 1970s and throughout the 1980s. He was involved with The Music Show, an exhibition of the Irish music industry held in the RDS in October 2008. He was Chairman of the Independent Radio and Television Commission (now the BCI) between 1993 and 1998. He has written several books, including Into the Heart: The Stories Behind Every U2 Song.

He graduated from University College Dublin with a Bachelor of Arts degree. Whilst in college, Stokes was a member of a band called Eyeless, alongside Neil Jordan. He was also a freelance writer for outlets such as The Irish Times before founding Hot Press. He lives with his wife, Mairin Sheehy, in Dublin.

On 20 June 2002, he appeared on an episode of Rattlebag which celebrated the 25th anniversary of Hot Press. In January 2008, he attended the recording sessions of "The Ballad of Ronnie Drew" in Windmill Lane Studios. He has appeared on the interactive music series The Raw Sessions.

Stokes has also appeared as a panellist on Questions and Answers. On radio he has featured on Five Seven Live, This Week, Morning Ireland and Drivetime.

In 2007, he pursued a High Court action against high-profile MCD promoter Denis Desmond and Riverdance's Moya Doherty and John McColgan in the aftermath of the Hot Press Music Hall of Fame Museum's failure. The "substantial" court action was settled.

Awards
Stokes won Editor of the Year at the 2008 PPAI Magazine of the Year Awards.

Stokes received an industry award at the 2009 Meteor Awards. Tributes were paid by Niall Breslin, Tom Dunne, Snow Patrol, Bono and The Edge.

|-
| 2008 || Niall Stokes || PPAI Magazine of the Year Awards – Editor of the Year || 
|-
| 2009 || Niall Stokes || Metor Music Awards – Industry Award || 
|-

Other accolades
Niall Stokes was presented with a lifetime achievement by Magazines Ireland in 2011
8 March 2011: "Niall Stokes founded Hot Press in 1977 and has steered the magazine through over 30 years to be one of Ireland's most successful magazines. Niall launched the career of some of the most prominent journalists in Ireland" – John Mullins, Zahara Publishing & Chairperson of Magazines Ireland.

The Irish Examiner included Stokes in its top fifty list of "most important and influential people in Irish music during 2005".

References

External links
 Hot Press website
 Hot Press on site at The O2 feat. Niall Stokes (#19)

1951 births
Living people
20th-century Irish people
21st-century Irish people
Alumni of University College Dublin
Hot Press people
Irish magazine editors
Irish music journalists
People from County Dublin
People educated at Synge Street CBS